Cavit is a masculine given name of Turkish origin. People with that name include:

 Cavit Cav (1905–1982), Turkish Olympian cyclist
 Cavit Erdel (1884–1933), military officer of the Ottoman Army and Turkish Army general
 Cavit Orhan Tütengil (1921–1979), Turkish sociologist, writer and columnist
 Mehmet Cavit Bey (1875–1926), Ottoman Sabbatean economist, newspaper editor and leading politician 
 Onur Cavit Biriz (born 2001), Turkish windsurfer

Turkish masculine given names